Black Rock FC is an American soccer club that plays in USL League Two. The team's administrative base is in Great Barrington, Massachusetts.

History

The club was established in 2013 to develop Berkshire County players and prep school athletes of all ages from grassroots programs through its U19 Academy team. A strategic alliance was forged in 2017 with GPS Stateline and Soccer Domain Academy.

For its first two seasons in USL League Two, home matches were played at the Hotchkiss School fields in Lakeville, Connecticut. As of February 2020, its primary USL2 venue is AppleJack Stadium in Manchester, Vermont. Other facilities include Berkshire Community College in Pittsfield, Massachusetts, indoor fields at Premier Sports Complex in Winsted, Connecticut and The Fieldhouse in Canaan, New York.

Year-by-year

Notable former players
The following players have gone on to play professionally after playing for Black Rock FC.

References

External links
 
 Black Rock FC at USL League Two

USL League Two teams
2013 establishments in Massachusetts
Association football clubs established in 2013
Soccer clubs in Massachusetts
Great Barrington, Massachusetts
Soccer clubs in Vermont